Jack Crawford defeated Keith Gledhill 2–6, 7–5, 6–3, 6–2 in the final to win the men's singles tennis title at the 1933 Australian Championships.

Seeds
The seeded players are listed below. Jack Crawford is the champion; others show the round in which they were eliminated.

 Ellsworth Vines (quarterfinals)
 Jack Crawford (champion)
 Wilmer Allison (semifinals)
 Harry Hopman (quarterfinals)
 John Van Ryn (second round)
 Vivian McGrath (semifinals)
 Keith Gledhill (finalist)
 Adrian Quist (quarterfinals)

Draw

Key
 Q = Qualifier
 WC = Wild card
 LL = Lucky loser
 r = Retired

Finals

Earlier rounds

Section 1

Section 2

External links
 

1933
1933 in Australian tennis
Men's Singles